Ouster may refer to:

 Ouster (company), a US-based lidar technology company founded in 2015
 Ouster clause, a function removing judicial review of legislation
 Ousters, characters in Dan Simmons' series of Hyperion novels
 A cause of action available to one who is refused access to their concurrent estate